Project 200 was a proposed waterfront redevelopment program during 1968, in Vancouver. It earned its name from the 200 million dollar investment needed for the project, and is best known for its "Waterfront Freeway".

Overview
The 300 million dollar redevelopment project was introduced to the Vancouver city council on June 28, 1966, by major powerful retail companies including, Grosvenor-Laing Limited, Marathon Realty Company, Woodwards, and Simpson Sears. In fact, some claim the only reason Woodward's is still here today is because of this investment. On December 5, 1968, the project was approved by City Council, with a 4.4 acre square plot of land to be rezoned, and 2 office towers to be built, with supporting retail, and commercial areas, with a main square, known as Canada Square, are all to be laid over the CP tracks behind Waterfront station.

At the same time, the federal government assigned Swan-Wooster Engineering, today known as Sandwell Engineering (the same group that built the Ironworkers Memorial Bridge and more), to study a third inlet crossing at Brockton point, with consideration of future rapid transit. After many designs of the freeway, and crossing, city council choose to build Waterfront Freeway, which would connect to the Brockton Point Tunnel and to the brand new 401 highway (Highway 1) to the east.

In 1967, more office towers were proposed, including a federal government building, and one of the buildings towering over 210 metres, higher than any other building in Vancouver today, mostly due to a view cone bylaw, set by the City of Vancouver. The only building built was Granville Square located on 200 Granville Street, leased to Canadian Pacific, and now owned by the Vancouver Sun.

Freeway
A waterfront freeway was to be laid over the today's CP tracks and was to run elevated, before curving north across the Burrard Inlet. Ramps would have led straight into parking garages, which would have had 7000 parking spots. The freeway would have connected to the southbound eight-lane Chinatown freeway over Carrall Street before meeting with the 4-level stack Georgia Interchange connecting the Georgia Viaduct to the west, the also proposed east–west freeway to the east, and north–south freeway over Main Street to the south. The interchange also included the "Columbia Connector". The Georgia Viaduct would also be split to include the "Taylor Expressway", an elevated freeway running westbound on the north shore of False Creek.

All of this was to be built over industrial land and railroads.

Failure
The project failed due to the lack of federal and provincial funding. Councilors had trouble building freeways in the past. The councilors expected to get some money from the National Housing Board since it was a redevelopment project, but there were many confusions and conflicts between senior levels of government. However, some housing along the paths of proposed freeways was built, such as 1450 Chestnut St., 350 Keefer, Skeena Terrace, and most notably Raymur Place housing.

At one point the provincial government would have paid for 1/3 of the cost if the federal government would pay for another 1/3 but they refused again. After this city councillors were infuriated that they were not receiving the same funding as other cities, such as the recently completed freeways in Montreal.

In fact, Vancouver mayor Tom Campbell went as far as to call the freeways "parkways" to make the federal government happy, to no great effect. Large civil protests over the Carrall Street connector through Chinatown also contributed to the failure. At first the Chinatown Homeowners Association was happy that a freeway was being built through Chinatown—meaning more customers—until they found out it would be 30 to 50 feet high, 8 to 10 lanes wide and would form a "roof" over Carrall Street.

But there were no civil protests like these against Project 200 as it was laid over railway tracks.

There are still small remnants of this freeway project including a curved park on Gore & Union which was supposed to accommodate an offramp. Vancouver is now the only major city in North America without a freeway in its downtown core.

See also
Highway revolt

References

Further reading

History of Vancouver
Anti-road protest
Cancelled highway projects in Canada